Since California became a U.S. state in 1850, it has sent  congressional delegations to the United States Senate and United States House of Representatives. Each state elects two senators to serve for six years, and members of the House to two-year terms.

These are tables of congressional delegations from California to the United States Senate and the United States House of Representatives.

Beginning in the 118th Congress, California will send only 52 individuals to the United States House of Representatives, down from the current 53 due to redistricting following the 2020 census. This is the first time the number of Representatives from California will decline in American history.

Current delegation 

California's current congressional delegation in the  consists of its two senators, both of whom are Democrats, and its 52 representatives: 40 Democrats and 12 Republicans.

United States Senate

Mid-term changes

United States House of Representatives

1850–1861: 2 seats 
Following statehood on September 9, 1850, California had two seats in the House.

1861–1873: 3 seats 
It retained the third seat following the 1860 census. For four years, the seats were elected at-large statewide on a general ticket. Since 1865, districts were used.

1873–1883: 4 seats 
Following the 1870 census, California was apportioned four seats.

1883–1893: 6 seats 
Following the 1880 census, California was apportioned six seats. From 1883 to 1887, the two new seats were elected at-large, statewide. Since 1887, the entire delegation was redistricted.

1893–1903: 7 seats 
Following the 1890 census, California was apportioned seven seats.

1903–1913: 8 seats 
Following the 1900 census, California was apportioned eight seats.

1913–1933: 11 seats 
Following the 1910 census, California was apportioned 11 seats.

1933–1943: 20 seats 
Following the 1930 census, California was apportioned 20 seats.

1943–1953: 23 seats 
Following the 1940 census, California was apportioned 23 seats.

1953–1963: 30 seats 
Following the 1950 census, California was apportioned 30 seats.

1963–1973: 38 seats 
Following the 1960 census, California was apportioned 38 seats.

1973–1983: 43 seats
Following the 1970 census, California was apportioned 43 seats.

1983–1993: 45 seats 
Following the 1980 census, California was apportioned 45 seats.

1993–2003: 52 seats 
Following the 1990 census, California was apportioned 52 seats.

2003–present: 53 seats
Following the 2000 census, California was apportioned 53 seats.

2023–present: 52 seats
Following the 2020 census, California was apportioned 52 seats.

Key

See also

List of United States congressional districts
California's congressional districts
Political party strength in California

References 

 
 
California
Politics of California
Congressional delegations